Sabretooth (Victor Creed) is a character appearing in American comic books published by Marvel Comics, most commonly in association with the X-Men, in particular as an enemy of the mutant Wolverine. Created by writer Chris Claremont and artist John Byrne, the character made his first appearance in Iron Fist #14 (August 1977). The original portrayal of Sabretooth was that of a non-powered serial killer, but was later written as a mutant possessing bestial superhuman abilities, most notably a rapid healing factor, razor-sharp fangs and claws, and superhuman senses. He is a vicious assassin, who was responsible for numerous deaths throughout history, both as a paid mercenary and for his personal pleasure. Accounts on how his enmity with Wolverine originated differs depending on different writers. One of the most common accounts is that Wolverine and Sabretooth were both participants of the Cold War supersoldier program Weapon X, and that Sabretooth saw Wolverine as competition and therefore antagonized him. While Wolverine is depicted as suppressing his more savage qualities, Sabretooth does the opposite and embraces them, until the events of the 2014 storyline "AXIS".

The character has appeared in several X-Men media. In live-action, it was portrayed by Tyler Mane in the film X-Men (2000) and by Liev Schreiber in the film X-Men Origins: Wolverine (2009). In May 2008, Wizard magazine ranked Sabretooth #193 of the 200 best comic book characters of all time. In 2009, Sabretooth was ranked as IGN's 44th Greatest Comic Book Villain of All Time.

Publication history

The character first appeared in Iron Fist #14 (August 1977) and was created by Chris Claremont and John Byrne. Initially appearing as "the Slasher", Sabretooth was conceived as a recurring antagonist for Iron Fist, whom he fights several times. He works for a time with the Constrictor as a partner-in-crime, and clashes repeatedly with Iron Fist and Power Man. Sabretooth also appeared in comics such as The Spectacular Spider-Man. Chris Claremont introduced him as a minor X-Men villain, a member of the Marauders, during the "Mutant Massacre" crossover in 1986.

He rose to greater prominence when he was split off from the Marauders and became a recurring antagonist of an individual member of the X-Men, Wolverine. Sabretooth was subsequently featured in limited series and one-shot comics including Sabretooth and Mystique and Sabretooth: In the Red Zone, and even had his own ongoing reprint series in the mid-1990s, Sabretooth Classics.

Origin
Chris Claremont had meant for Sabretooth to be Wolverine's father, though this was contradicted  by subsequent writers. Claremont, when asked what he had intended to be the relationship between Wolverine and Sabretooth, stated:

Father and son. That's why Sabretooth always considered Logan "sloppy seconds" to his "original" / "real deal." The other critical element in my presentation of their relationship was that, in their whole life, Logan has never defeated Sabretooth in a knock-down, drag-out, kill-or-be-killed berserker fight. By the same token, on every one of his birthdays, Sabretooth has always managed to find him, no matter where Logan was or what he was doing, and come within an inch of killing him. For no other reason than to remind him that he could.

Genetic tests performed by S.H.I.E.L.D. confirmed that Sabretooth and Wolverine were not father and son.

An interviewer asked Paul Jenkins if Dog Logan was Sabretooth. Jenkins had not intended the speculation, but said would not have a problem with another writer doing this later. The miniseries Astonishing Spider-Man & Wolverine has shown that the two characters are not the same person. A one-shot specialty comic entitled X-Men Origins: Sabretooth chronicling some of the character's earliest childhood experiences, differing distinctly from Dog's life. It is also later shown that Sabretooth and Dog are separate people.

X-Men Forever
In X-Men Forever, Chris Claremont's continuation of his run on X-Men (non-canonical to the mainstream timeline and taking place in the 161 Marvel Universe), Sabretooth is established as Wolverine's father. He attacks the X-Mansion, but is blinded by Storm.

Claremont has stated in an interview that in X-Men Forever the original true Sabretooth makes his reappearance after a long time, and that most of the previous appearances of Sabretooth prior to X-Men Forever #2, that follows directly after X-Men (vol. 2) #3, were that of a weaker Sabretooth clone created by Mister Sinister. The original true Sabretooth reappears dressed in the Jim Lee costume in X-Men Forever, which would make the weaker clone the one dressed in the John Byrne costume. Claremont claims he always meant for the Sabretooth dressed in the Byrne costume to be later outed as a clone of the original true Sabretooth. Claremont stated: "Speaking specifically of the cast of X-Men Forever, one character who's becoming more enticing is Sabretooth, in part because (at least as it relates to my conception of him) very little is actually known. They then filled his skeleton with adamantium. At this specific point of his life, readers haven't really seen that much of him over the years, since the Sabes that's shown up most over the time is a less-endowed copy cloned from spare cells by Mr. Sinister."

Fictional character biography

Early life
Sabretooth's real name is believed to be Victor Creed. Sabretooth's memories have been tampered with by clandestine organizations such as Weapon X and so much of what appears to be his past is not of credible account. The clearest accounts of Victor's childhood begin with him murdering his brother Luther Creed over a piece of pie. His father Zebediah then chains him in the basement like an animal and systematically pulls out Victor's elongated canines, which perennially grow back. Victor begs his mother Victoria to let him go, but she does not. Years pass until Victor eventually gnaws off his own hand to escape the basement and apparently murders his parents. It is, however, later revealed that Sabretooth only killed his father, and took care of his mother financially, visiting her frequently until the woman's death.

Victor is revealed to have had a brother named Saul and a sister named Clara who are believed to be the reason for Victor's ongoing feud with the X-Men's Wolverine. Saul Creed was a tracker and hunter, while Clara Creed was an animal handler. They helped track down the feral James "Logan" Howlett for a circus. They also helped Logan escape after the man was experimented on by Nathaniel Essex, and the three go on the run. Saul perceives Logan to be stealing Clara, leading to Saul tipping Essex off regarding Logan's location. In the ensuing chaos, Logan accidentally kills Clara, although her healing factor later revives Clara. Saul, not knowing this, blames Essex for Clara's death, and the two men seek Essex out, Saul revealing that Clara was his sister. Logan, however, finds out that Saul betrayed them to Essex, and drowns Saul in a potion of Essex's. Horrified by this, Clara asks Wolverine to never look for her again. Victor was then informed about his brother's death.

In an early tale, Logan lives in a small Blackfoot community. One day, Sabretooth tracks him down in Canada, and seemingly murders his one-time teammate's lover Silver Fox on Logan's birthday, after Silver Fox rejects him. In this tale, it is indicated that Logan did not have particularly strong feelings for Silver Fox, and that the murder was simply the last straw in a series of grievances he held against Sabretooth. Creed eventually adopts a tradition of tracking Logan down on his foe's birthday with the intention of fighting.

Early history
Creed is recruited into a top secret CIA covert ops unit known as Team X, with allies John Wraith (Kestrel), Logan (Wolverine), Silver Fox (whose death was a hoax), and David North (Maverick). On one mission, the psychopathic Sabretooth kills a crucial scientist during a battle against Russian supersoldier Omega Red, causing Team X to break up. During this period he fathers a son, Graydon Creed, with the mutant shapeshifter Mystique, who is undercover in the guise of a spy named Leni Zauber. Graydon grows up to found Friends of Humanity, an anti-mutant organization, and while running for president is assassinated by Mystique from an alternate future.

After the disbanding of Team X, Logan and Victor meet up again, as friends, when Logan learns of anti-mutant forces within the government. Victor and Logan form a team of rebel mutants, and Victor falls in love with a mutant named Holo. Eventually, Creed grows tired of the fighting and wants to leave with Holo, but she has already decided against it. In the final conflict, Holo is mortally wounded. Creed blames Logan for her death.

Next, Sabretooth is recruited by the Weapon X program, but it is unknown what, if any, enhancements he receives. As part of the program, his memories are tampered with by the psychic mutant Aldo Ferro, also known as Psi-Borg.

In 1968, Creed (using the alias Sabretooth) works as a mercenary assassin in Saigon. An individual called the "White Devil", involved in the disappearance of soldiers and locals, contacts Sabretooth and offers to employ him as one of his own enforcers. Sabretooth accepts.

Supervillain

Emerging as a costumed villain, Sabretooth becomes partners with the Constrictor and the two act as enforcers for major criminal interests. Sabretooth battles Iron Fist and is badly beaten. Sabretooth and the Constrictor then fight Iron Fist, Luke Cage, Misty Knight, and Colleen Wing only to be defeated again. With the Constrictor, Creed begins to stalk and kill human beings for pleasure, which earns him the newspaper title of "The Slasher"; he also attacks Misty Knight again. With the Constrictor, he attacks Harmony Young, but they are defeated by Luke Cage. The Constrictor and Sabretooth dissolve their partnership, and Sabretooth nearly kills the Constrictor at one time.

Sabretooth is next reunited with his employer, the Foreigner, who claims to have trained the mercenary at some point. He attacks the Black Cat, nearly biting through her leg until he encounters a crowbar hidden underneath her boot. He is defeated by Spider-Man, and outmaneuvered and humiliated by the Black Cat in combat.

Sabretooth eventually encounters a thief by the name of Gambit and the two fight, but find they are not exactly enemies. Later while recruiting for Mister Sinister, Gambit gathers a group of mutant criminals he has associated with who form the Marauders. Sinister clones several of the Marauders so that he has a loyal group of lackeys after the originals die.

The Marauders are directed to massacre the Morlocks, which sets Sabretooth in another battle against Wolverine. Sabretooth and the Marauders join in an attack on Polaris, and battle Wolverine again during the Marauders' attempt to kill Madelyne Pryor. Wolverine stabs Sabretooth through the heart and uses Scrambler's power to disable his healing factor, killing him. He is replaced by a clone by the time the X-Men attack the Marauders' headquarters. With the X-Men slaughtering his teammates, Sabretooth flees and is reunited with Mr. Sinister at the X-Mansion. The X-Men and X-Factor attack them there, and apparently kill both Sabretooth and Sinister. However, Sabretooth manages to keep his tradition of stalking Wolverine on his birthday that year.

Sabretooth returns to the sewers to slaughter leftover Morlocks. He kills Chickenwings, hunts Mole, and then battles Archangel. Caliban, a surviving Morlock, hunts Sabretooth down. Sabretooth proves no match for Caliban, who breaks his back and leaves him for dead. It takes weeks for his healing factor to repair his spine, during which he sustains himself on sewer water and passing vermin. He recovers just in time to confront Wolverine, who stumbled upon him while lost in the sewers. He attacks Wolverine again in Times Square, but their conflict is cut short by a vigilante who shoots them both with hallucinogen-laced bullets which trigger memories of their time as partners in the CIA.

Sabretooth then allies with Fenris and Matsu'o Tsurayaba against the X-Men and Maverick. While attending a wrestling match, Sabretooth is attacked by the Weapon X robot Shiva. He is rescued by John Wraith, who convinces him to team up with the rest of Team X - Wolverine, Maverick, Silver Fox, and John Wraith - to discover why their anti-aging factors are suddenly failing. Their quest leads them to the telepath Aldo Ferro, the Psi-Borg. Ferro overwhelms them all with psychic illusions, concluding with a toothed tree which apparently consumes Creed.

Suffering from severe bloodlust, Sabretooth hires telepathic mutant Birdy to help him keep his urges in check by providing what he calls "the glow", a psychic blast that satiates his bloodlust and numbs the pain of his suppressed memories as a youth, allowing himself control for short periods.

Betrayal of the X-Men and brief alliance with X-Factor

A short time later, Birdy is killed by Sabretooth's grown son Graydon, who now has a hatred for mutants, especially his father. Without "the glow", Sabretooth slips into a murderous killing spree. This culminates in a clash with Maverick, whom Sabretooth defeats. He escapes, claiming only Wolverine can do what needs to be done to the psychotic Creed. Afterward, Maverick approaches the X-Men in Japan, and an ancient telepath, comatose since the nuclear bomb that destroyed Hiroshima, who mind-links with Creed and the team discovers Creed's psychosis was rooted in his time as a CIA operative. On a mission, he slaughtered a target, his wife (a "frail" for Creed), and a little boy. The look in the boy's eyes has followed Creed ever since. Ultimately, Sabretooth attacks Charles Xavier, leader of the X-Men. As Xavier infiltrates Creed's mind, he discovers that every victim Sabretooth has killed is remembered by the villain. Xavier is confident this means Creed values human life, and there is hope for the mutant. Sabretooth is incarcerated, as a wanted murderer, in a holographic environment because Xavier does not want him to roam on the grounds. Sabretooth is angered, but grudgingly stays with the team. During his incarceration, he assists in battles against the X-Cutioner and the Phalanx. Caliban, free of Apocalypse's control, kidnaps the X-Man Jubilee in exchange for Sabretooth. When Sabretooth arrives, he mauls Caliban's face, and Caliban flees. Wolverine, who had left the team after his adamantium was removed by Magneto, returns, and the villain escapes for a fight. This leads to Wolverine stabbing one of his claws into Sabretooth's brain.

The newer, gentler Sabretooth is frequently nursed by X-Force member Boomer; he eventually reveals that he was feigning helplessness, and attacks Boomer. Psylocke saves the young mutant's life, and she uses her psionic knife to disable him. However, this no longer works because his brain injury from Wolverine freed him from the need for "the glow", furthermore rendering him resistant to telepathic detection and control. Retaliating, Sabretooth nearly kills Psylocke, but he is finally confronted by the X-Men, who incapacitate him.

He is turned over to the custody of Dr. Valerie Cooper, who fits him with an explosive restraining collar and forces him to participate as a member of the government-sponsored X-Factor team. Creed later admits he was a "sleeper" agent with the mission of executing X-Factor members the government could not control. He eventually escapes, and returns once more to mercenary work. Under unknown circumstances he gains adamantium skeleton and claws. Sabretooth is captured, along with Wolverine, by Apocalypse, who forces the two to fight each other for the right to become Apocalypse's new Horseman, Death. After Sabretooth's defeat, Apocalypse extracts the adamantium from him and bonds it to Wolverine, Wolverine having fought to win as he felt that he might resist the brainwashing and so be easier to defeat than Sabretooth, who might actually enjoy what he had become.

Sabretooth then joins Mystique's new Brotherhood of Evil Mutants, calling itself the Brotherhood, where he participates in an assassination attempt against Senator Robert Kelly.

Weapon X and the Brotherhood

Later, he is forced to become a member of a relaunched Weapon X program, where his skeleton is infused with adamantium once more. In Wolverine (vol. 2) #166, Sabretooth reveals that by means of genetic enhancement the Weapon X program has increased his strength and accelerated his healing factor. Eventually he escaped the program again and resumed working solo. However, he sometimes worked on a team, such as when he worked with several other villains to locate the Identity Disc, a record of heroes' secret identities. This ended up being a ruse, though Nick Fury had the real disc.

Later, in Canada, he encountered Sasquatch and the newest Wendigo. Sasquatch believes Creed may be responsible for some of the human deaths occurring there. Creed is seen setting traps and acting mysteriously. Sasquatch discovers Sabretooth is playing a twisted mind-game with the Wendigo before attempting to kill it. Sabretooth and the Wendigo fall into the Arctic Sea with Sabretooth biting the Wendigo's neck, and both are presumed dead by Sasquatch. After a fearsome battle in the arctic waters, Sabretooth emerged victorious with the hide of the Wendigo.

Sabretooth would later attack the Xavier Institute, in a revamped Brotherhood consisting of leader Black Tom Cassidy, Mammomax, Avalanche, Exodus, and undercover heroes Nocturne and Juggernaut. Wolverine claims to have killed Sabretooth, spreading him "all over the grass", although Black Tom's plant abilities probably contributed to Sabretooth's survival; he returns in X-Men: The 198 Files.

Reluctant alliance with the X-Men

In X-Men (vol. 2) #188 (August 2006), Sabretooth was spotted fleeing a mysterious group of superhumans collectively known as The Children. Their reasons for pursuing him remained unknown, but two of them—Sangre and Serafina—were tracking him. Sangre activated a singularity generator that annihilated most of the town and killed all its citizens, except for a little girl whom Serafina deliberately shielded from the destruction so there would be a witness to what had happened. He later encountered two more of the Children—Aguja and Fuego. They attacked him and temporarily neutralized his healing factor, but he managed to escape regardless, only to end up at the Xavier Institute later that night seeking sanctuary.

It is revealed that the Children are after Creed because he has seen them and knows who they are, while the public believed the X-Men destroyed the town. It is only when Rogue, the leader of the team, injected Nano-Sentinels into Sabretooth's blood that they take him along with their fight against the Children, a factor that one of the Children exploited. At one point, Cannonball saved his life during the battle. Sabretooth rewards him with some inside information: "The first time you turn your back, you're dead." Following the incident on Providence, Creed escaped the X-Men, but was hurled into the middle of the Pacific Ocean by Cable.

Writer Mike Carey noted he has no plans on redeeming Sabretooth, saying, "I'm not going to try and show a heroic side to Sabretooth's nature; I’m not going to retcon him so that there are reasons for his actions that make him forgivable. The things he's done are not forgivable and he can't be redeemed. I'm not making him into a hero; I'm making him into a team member and there are reasons within the first storyline as to why he ends up fighting alongside the X-Men against another enemy. And there are reasons why it's not so easy to simply shake him off again afterwards. There are things that are going on that will sort of unfold during the first year of my run which explain his being there and explain his being accepted with very, very grave misgivings into the team."

Death

Sabretooth renews his rivalry with Wolverine following the latter's return to the X-Mansion. A fight soon breaks out with Wolverine tossing Sabretooth through a window. During the fight, Wolverine thinks back to the time when Sabretooth had, supposedly, killed Silver Fox. He remembers Sabretooth saying, "quod sum eris" and asks what it means. Sabretooth explains that it means "I am what you will be." Wolverine loses control and calls Sabretooth insane before placing his fist against Sabretooth's throat. Creed tells him if he extracts his claws, he will rip his heart out. Wolverine replies, "Let 'er rip", and pops his claws into Sabretooth's throat. Wolverine later regains consciousness and finds himself chained to the roof of the Blackbird. He quickly breaks free of the chains and is surprised to find Sabretooth piloting the jet. Wolverine breaks into the cockpit and begins choking Sabretooth with one of the chains and causes him to crash.

The two emerge from the flaming wreckage and, while healing from the injuries sustained in the crash, begin fighting once again until separated by a lightning bolt, courtesy of Wolverine's former teammate and current Queen of Wakanda, Storm. A short time later Sabretooth is chained up in the royal palace of Wakanda and complains to Wolverine, Storm, and the Black Panther. Sabretooth snaps the chains and escapes into the jungle, with the Black Panther quickly giving chase. The Black Panther catches up to him and the two begin to fight, with Sabretooth quickly gaining the upper hand. He holds the Black Panther off the ground by the neck, preparing to strike a killing blow, when Wolverine suddenly appears and slices off Sabretooth's left hand.

Once the fight between the Black Panther and Sabretooth is broken up by Wolverine, Sabretooth is brought back to the Wakandan Palace and placed in a vibranium holding cell and guarded around the clock. The battle scene between the Black Panther and Sabretooth then becomes the focus of why Wolverine was brought to the palace in the first place. It seems that amongst the bones from an elephant graveyard, there are also some unidentified skeletal remains of another offshoot of Homo sapiens called "Lupus sapiens". The Black Panther and Wolverine are discussing that instead of there being one evolutionary path between humans and monkeys, that there may also have been one that developed from lupines. It is believed at this point that Romulus is the first of this race, and it is revealed that he has been the one behind Daken's attacks, and the driving force behind the Weapon X program. After the discussion with the Black Panther, Wolverine is awakened by the stench of blood from something that has a scent similar to his and Sabretooth's and also something else. It turns out to be an enhanced Wild Child who has now surpassed the abilities of both Wolverine and Sabretooth, thanks to Romulus. Wild Child strikes Wolverine with poison-tipped claws and incapacitates him for two days. When Wolverine awakens, he finds Sasquatch, Wolfsbane, and Feral and her sister Thornn ready to go back with him to the Weapon X complex so that they might get to the bottom of this lupine mystery.

Once they all arrive at the Weapon X facility, Wolverine is plagued by memories that seem to mix past and present together and all of them controlled by Romulus. Wolverine goes in alone telling the others to stay put on the plane, but they do not listen. Feral and Thornn, who were granted their lupine appearance back by Romulus, are separated and Sabretooth, reduced to his animalistic state, has gutted Feral and she is dying. Wolverine gets Feral back to the ship and finds that Thornn and Wolfsbane are in shock from the encounter, along with Sasquatch having been incapacitated by Wild Child. Once they are on their way, Wolverine goes back to the Xavier Institute and asks Cyclops to give him back the Muramasa sword, which he gave to Scott in case he was too out of control and needed to be put down for good. Cyclops only does this after Emma Frost reads Wolverine's mind and sees the horrors that Wolverine has been witnessing when he dreams: the horrors committed by Victor Creed throughout the years. Sword in hand, Wolverine then sets out to find and kill Sabretooth once and for all.

After the events in "Evolution", Wolverine has been waiting for an unspecified length of time at Silver Fox's cabin in the Canadian wilderness. Sabretooth finally shows up and immediately attacks him. In the ensuing battle Wolverine cuts off Sabretooth's left arm with the Muramasa. Sabretooth, still in his animalistic state tries to re-attach his arm allowing his healing factor to kick in, but it does not work. Wolverine explains to a bewildered Creed that it is because the sword interrupts the healing factor and that he has to finally kill Sabretooth for what he has done. Managing to regain control and speak between grunts, Sabretooth tells him, "Do it". Wolverine then decapitates Sabretooth, finally putting an end to his long-time enemy. Logan then walks away, leaving both Creed's body and head in the snow to rot.

Hell
Sabretooth appears to Wolverine, leashed and under the control of the Devil himself, who has claimed to have broken Victor's will. Victor shows defiance by striking the face of his defeated master after Wolverine uses his broken bone claws to pin the Devil to a wall. After Wolverine has an interrupted discussion with his father, it is shown that Victor wields the Devil's sword, which is being held as a symbol of who is the ruler of Hell. Wolverine fights Victor again, mentioning, as he beheads him once more, that there is no coming back when someone is killed by the sword. Wolverine leaves Victor's beheaded soul lying in the pit of Hell.

Return

It was later revealed that the Sabretooth beheaded by Logan was in fact one of several clones grown by Romulus. The real Sabretooth comes out of hiding and starts a war between rival gangs in Japan. He is hired to kill Mr. Takenaka, leader of the Yakuza, and tosses him from a jet. Creed is later approached by other Yakuza members to accept an offer at an airport in L.A. Sabretooth says he will miss an important meeting by going, and kills the Yakuza. Creed sets a trap for Logan before heading to his meeting, but it fails causing the two to battle. Their battling ends with them surrounded by Yakuza, the Hand, the new Silver Samurai and Wolverine's adopted daughter. Logan goes to save his daughter, while Victor grabs the Silver Samurai. It is later revealed Creed is working with Mystique again as well as the Mind Ninjas. Mystique disables Wolverine while Sabretooth heads on to the next part of his plan. He escapes with the man who hired him, Azuma Goda, to cause a war between the Hand and the Yakuza. As Goda reveals his master plan of becoming a ruler of Japan by proxies, Sabretooth has his own plans. He allows Wolverine to slip in and try to kill Goda while he saves Mystique from Lord Deathstrike and makes him an offer. The three of them arrive at a meeting of the remaining leaders of the fighting factions, who are deciding the fate of Tokyo and kill them all as Sabretooth declares himself the new "invisible" ruler of East Asia. Sabretooth later holds a party with but Wolverine crashes the party and defeats all the guests, he then tells Sabretooth "Happy birthday, from your old pal Wolverine".

Sabretooth trains Kade Kilgore in combat and tactics, with the purpose of attacking the Jean Grey School. Sabretooth tells Kilgore the best way to destroy them is to hit them in the heart, physical or metaphorical. Kilgore figures that the heart of the school is Beast (Henry McCoy). Sabretooth ambushes the latter managing to physically wound him before taking his fight to Abigail Brand, Hank's girlfriend. With help from Beast, Abigail is able to blast Sabretooth away.

Later while investigating the grave of Sabretooth, Wolverine finds that the body still is in it, which indicates that Sabretooth was not resurrected. Wolverine also discovers that it was apparently Romulus behind everything and after being beaten, he is saved by a mysterious woman with long red hair who tells him to go to the Weapon X facility, but she disappears before he gets further answers. Wolverine goes to explore the facility only to find that someone has been experimenting with Sabretooth's genetics and has cloned him, one awakens, who Wolverine recognizes by scent to be the real Sabretooth. After fighting the Sabretooth clones, Wolverine encounters the mysterious woman again, claiming that she is Romulus' twin sister Remus. She reveals that the whole "Lupine Sapiens" story was an elaborate hoax by her brother intended to be a ruse for his real goal of creating a master race of natural mutants artificially enhanced by a new type of adamantium, using Wolverine as a template. After tracking Romulus, Wolverine brutally attacks and incapacitates Sabretooth. While Wolverine fights Romulus, Sabretooth fights with Cloak who has been investigating with Wolverine. While Romulus is ultimately defeated by Wolverine and left in the Raft facility, Sabretooth manages to escape from the battle.

Sabretooth appears as a member of Daken's short-lived Brotherhood of Mutants. Then later becomes a headmaster of the Hellfire Academy. While he also works with Mystique to frame the original X-Men for a series of bank thefts.

Inversion
During the AXIS storyline, Sabretooth appears as a member of Magneto's unnamed supervillain group during the fight against Red Skull's Red Onslaught form. Sabretooth experiences a 'moral inversion' that turns him into a hero when the attempt to bring out the Xavier elements of Onslaught backfire, prompting Steve Rogers to recruit him and the other inverted villains into a new team of 'Astonishing Avengers' to defeat the inverted heroes. At the end of the storyline, it is shown that his inversion from evil to good is permanent due to him having been protected by an energy shield generated by the inverted Iron Man- along with Havok- leaving him reflecting on what he has become. Sabretooth turned himself over to the authorities and plans to do good by Wolverine's example when he gets out.

Sabretooth later joins the Avengers Unity Division and accompanies them to the High Evolutionary's Counter-Earth to look for Scarlet Witch and Quicksilver. He also assists the main Avengers team in confronting the latest version of Ultron.

All-New, All-Different Marvel
As part of the All-New, All-Different Marvel event, Sabretooth appears as a member of Magneto's X-Men branch to protect mutantkind at all costs. As time goes on, his inversion starts to wear down. He notes that he can feel his former self coming back - the part of him that cared about nothing but the kill. He admits not being able to keep living the lie his inverted-self has been, but he does not intend to become the monster he was, so he must become something different. He believes he needs something to fight for to stay grounded, and he remembers the promise he made to Monet, whom he developed feelings for. He promised to keep her curse secret and wanted to help find a cure and beat the darkness within her. When the team disbanded, Sabretooth went off with Monet to continue trying to help her.

ResurrXion
After leaving Monet due to her becoming too evil, Creed went to live in a cabin in the woods during the "Weapons of Mutant Destruction" storyline. He is "recruited" by Old Man Logan to battle against a new Weapon X Project. They alongside the captives of the Weapon X Project discover that they are created Hulk/Wolverine hybrids which led to the creation of Weapon H.

During the "Hunt for Wolverine" storyline, Sabretooth is seen at Chester's Bar where he, Daken, and Lady Deathstrike discuss Wolverine being sighted after returning from the dead. Sabretooth tells Daken that he will kill Wolverine and then kill Daken. The three of them follow his trail to Maybelle, Arizona. Sabretooth and Lady Deathstrike continue searching Maybelle for Wolverine when they are attacked by zombies made from those at a birthday party. One of them bites Sabretooth as Lady Deathstrike gets him away from the zombies. Both of them wonder where the zombies came from. As they get to their car, it suddenly explodes. Sabretooth starts running and finds that his zombie bite is not healing. Sabretooth comes across more zombies as he starts killing them with Lady Deathstrike not far behind him. Both of them take refuge in a garage. When Daken catches up to them, Lady Deathstrike and Sabretooth are informed of a glowing green device in the power station that has to do with the zombies and they must fight their way past the zombies to destroy it before Maybelle is burned to the ground. While fighting the zombies and soldiers from Soteira Killteam Nine, Sabretooth discovers that one of the soldiers is a zombified version of his dead son Graydon. After getting Daken away from the attackers after he was stabbed by the zombified version of Lord Dark Wind, Sabreooth defends Daken from his zombified son as there is 10 minutes left before Maybelle is burned to the ground. Sabretooth continues his fight with his zombie son trying to get the information on how he was raised as a zombie until Lady Deathstrike stabs Graydon in the neck and states that the adamantium that they tracked was her father's adamantium. With six minutes left before Soteira burns Maybelle to the ground, Sabretooth and Lady Deathstrike destroy the glowing device. The next day, Sabretooth and Lady Deathstrike carjack someone outside a diner as Sabretooth suggests to Lady Deathstrike to have her Reaver friends get her a new hand. Lady Deathstrike tells Sabretooth to shut up and drive. Sabretooth later relayed his discovery to Kitty Pryde as she mentions to Iron Man and Daredevil that he is trying to get some redemption.

House of X
In the pages of "House of X and Powers of X", Mystique, Sabretooth, and Toad infiltrate the base of Damage Control searching for information in the databases. While they get what they searched for, Sabertooth maims several guards in the chaos and is eventually captured by the Fantastic Four. While the Fantastic Four are about to take away Sabretooth, Cyclops arrives to bring him back to Krakoa due to diplomatic immunity. While tensions arise between him and Mister Fantastic, Cyclops decides to leave Sabretooth to them to avoid a situation. In the superhuman prison known as Project Achilles, a trial is being held for Sabretooth. The trial is interrupted by Emma Frost who presents the judge with a pardon from the U.S. Supreme Court as the U.S. government has agreed to a general amnesty for all mutants on American soil in anticipation of Krakoa becoming a sovereign nation. Despite the protests of the human officials at the court, Emma and Sabretooth are allowed to walk free and return to Krakoa. The Quiet Council finds Sabretooth guilty of violating the second law and sentences him to exile deep within the bowels of Krakoa. Krakoa swallows him up as X laments the business of running a nation.

While in The Pit, Sabretooth was contacted mentally by Cypher on behalf of Krakoa itself, who gave him control of his own mental fantasy world. Sabretooth lived out several fantasy lives to entertain himself, at one point he even imagined himself walking freely through Krakoa. Although he remained in the pit, he was seen on Krakoa. While fantasizing about being king of Hell, he was interrupted by the arrival of the other exiled mutants Nekra, Madison Jeffries, Oya, Melter, and Third-Eye. He welcomed them to his Hell and informed them there is no escape. Sabretooth tried to attack the incomers at first, but after Third-Eye broke the illusion down, he was able to convince him the people he really wanted to hurt were their captors. Victor then began working on a plan for them all to escape The Pit, he taught them how to project their consciousness through the island and had them manifest themselves to gather allies from above. He decided to keep Melter back because he could sense he still had loyalty to Professor X. After brutalizing Melter, Sabretooth explained his plan to exposing the secret and inhumane imprisonments on Krakoa to bring public opinion against the Quiet Council, while he was talking Melter was able to gain enough control of his body to destroy Sabretooth's body in the material plane. The destruction of Sabretooth's body almost kills everyone in the pit because it was controlled by his mind, but Third-Eye saves the other prisoners by dragging their consciousnesses to the astral plane. Sabretooth's mind retreats into his memories while his healing factor fixes his body, he briefly manifests himself on land again to check the progress of his plan and finds rescue attempts are already being discussed. Back in his mental world he recreates his childhood home so he can have dinner with the other prisoners, after doing so they all discuss what they did to get thrown in the pit and whether they deserved to be there. Cypher than reached out to Victor again, angry that he'd been misusing their gift but Victor pointed out to them his plan was close to succeeding and convinced him they had no choice but to set him free. Sabretooth escaped from The Pit shortly after a failed attempt by Magma to free them resulted in everyone in the area being knocked unconscious. With no-one to see him and or offer resistance he ran towards Nekra's abandoned boat but was stopped unexpectedly by Mystique. Destiny had foreseen his escape attempt but to their shock told Mystique to allow him to sail off to freedom, asking him to "cause chaos", which he happily accepted. Cypher then sent the other exiles he had abandoned on a mission to find Sabretooth so he can face punishment for his escape.

Sabretooth's boat was caught and apprehended by Orchis agents, who took him to Dr. Barrington to be experimented on. After being vivisected by her, she left to deal with the rest of the exiles who had infiltrated her private island. While she was gone Sabretooth smashed through his glass container and went on a rampage throughout her base, killing everyone he could find before they activated the self destruct protocol. Sabretooth tracked down his boat and escaped to the Island where he cockily offered the rest of the  Exiles a ride.

After being reunited with his team, Sabretooth was given a savage beatdown by Nekra. Causing him to realise his healing factor, along with the rest of his powers, weren't working properly. This was due to a device Dr. Barrington had put inside his body during her experimentation called the Barrington coil. After convincing the team they still need him if they wanted to save Orphan-Maker and hearing from Nanny how dangerous he'd be if separated from his armor, Sabretooth and the exiled Mutants tracked down the second Orchis base for Mutant experimentation in a volcano ridden area of the Pacific Ocean called the Ring of Fire. Sabretooth was still deeply in pain due to the loss of his Healing Factor but was forced to pretend everything was fine because he wanted to hide this from the others. They discovered a huge prison filled with Mutants, all of whom expressed fear when Sabretooth arrived, something he took great pride in. When Dr. Barrington's creation came in through a wall, Nekra tried to resume their fight but Sabretooth stopped her because he could tell she was running away from something. That something was Orphan-Maker, who had taken off his helmet, apparently killing Dr. Barrington with one look. Sabretooth suggested they throw Orphan-Maker in a volcano before they were all killed by his emerging power, the team disagreed and Third-Eye offered a more humane solution that involved taking them all back to the Astral Plane. While there, the team discovered that Orchis had somehow built their third base inside the Astral Plane. While Nanny and Jeffries built a new armor for Orphan-Maker, Creed explored the base with Toad and Oya, getting into a fight with Toad over whether the failure of the mission that got him put in the pit was his own fault, until Oya interrupted them because she had noticed someone in an organic prison. Assuming the figure to be dangerous, Victor and Toad abandoned her, and rejoined the rest of the group. However Oya met with them later and revealed that the prisoner was in fact another Victor Creed.

Powers and abilities

Sabretooth is a mutant with a number of both natural and artificial improvements to his physiology compared to normal humans. His primary mutant power is an accelerated healing ability that allows him to regenerate damaged or destroyed areas of his body and cellular structure far beyond the capabilities of an ordinary human. Like Wolverine's, his abilities have been depicted with variable degrees of contradiction by various creators. Sabretooth's increased attributes stem, in part from said healing. This "healing factor" also grants him virtual immunity against most poisons, drugs, toxins, and diseases, and limited immunity to fatigue. The regenerative qualities of his powers cause him to age at an unusually slow rate. While he is of an unknown advanced age, Sabretooth has the appearance and vitality of a tall, very burly, highly muscular man in his late 20s to mid 30s.

The depiction of Sabretooth's powers has changed and evolved depending on creative team, with his healing power introduced as a retcon after he became Wolverine's rival. In other, earlier appearances, Sabretooth was much more average. In a fight with Spider-Man, he was incapacitated when his face was severely wounded, and did not display any accelerated healing. When Sabretooth returned, his still prominent wounds were reopened when he was hit in the face.

Sabretooth possesses acute senses that are comparable to certain animals. This includes the ability to see objects with greater clarity and at much greater distances than an ordinary human. He is able to see with this same level of clarity in almost complete darkness, just like a nocturnal hunter. It is also that said he can see infrared and ultraviolet portions of the spectrum.

He possesses some degree of notable physical abilities, such as superhuman strength due to his healing factor. The exact limits of his strength are unknown, though he originally could crush an iron barbell with ease. His physical strength has been artificially enhanced at least twice. The first was a strength enhancement from his son, Graydon. It was then further enhanced after joining the latest incarnation of the Weapon X Program. His healing factor also grants him superhuman stamina, so he can push himself at peak capacity for several days before fatigue sets in. On top of this he is depicted as having retractable claws that can rend normal clothing and flesh with ease.

His agility and reflexes were both naturally above human and further artificially-enhanced. With an ability to pounce like a hunting big cat, stalk and move quietly throughout his appearances, most human and some super powered enemies can not react to his leap before being hit.

Skills
Sabretooth is an excellent hand-to-hand and armed combatant, having been trained by various organizations such as the CIA, Department H's Weapon X program, the Foreigner, and HYDRA. He is also an expert at hunting and tracking, even without the use of his heightened senses. Sabretooth also developed a high resistance to telepathic probing and manipulation, after an incident where his brain was skewered. And even with that damage to his brain, it has been shown that Sabretooth is actually quite intelligent compared to the average person, as shown by his ability to avoid capture and escape the highest levels of incarceration without assistance. He is also highly skilled at psychological manipulation, and has demonstrated the ability to speak fluent German.

Reception
 In 2014, Entertainment Weekly ranked Sabretooth 66th in their "Let's rank every X-Man ever" list.
 In 2018, CBR.com ranked Sabretooth 21st in their "Age Of Apocalypse: The 30 Strongest Characters In Marvel's Coolest Alternate World" list.

Other versions

Age of Apocalypse and the Exiles
In an alternate universe in Marvel Comics depicted in the Age of Apocalypse storyline there is a vastly different version of Sabretooth. This version of the character has the same origin as the one in the normal continuity, but has a different moral alignment. He is actually one of the X-Men and a role model for other mutants in this alternate reality. This Sabretooth was initially a villain, having been recruited by Apocalypse, but he was cast out as a traitor when he expressed moral reservations about using nuclear weapons to wipe out the world's human population. Apocalypse intended to kill Sabretooth alongside the X-Men, but was thwarted by Magneto. Sabretooth came back into Apocalypse's fold and took part in a number of culls, but he eventually grew disgusted by his life and rebelled against Holocaust, for which he was imprisoned alongside the feral Wild Child. Instead of becoming a feral killer, like Holocaust intended, Sabretooth defeated Wild Child and became his master and protector. Together, the two escaped and joined the X-Men afterward. He became a hero and an ally of Logan (Weapon X), and even adopted a young girl, Blink, as his daughter. In the Exiles comics, he spent decades in an alternate dimension raising mutant children, attempting to teach them ethics and tolerance, without incident.

Also, this version of Sabretooth's biological son was theorized to be Nightcrawler, evidenced by the statement of Mystique that she had gone to the trouble of "finding a father with fur" when Nightcrawler complains he is cold and, when the Shadow King possesses Mystique, the captions reveal "one memory is more interesting then the others" and flashes to Sabretooth taunting Nightcrawler.

When the "Age of Apocalypse" timeline was apparently destroyed, Sabretooth became the leader of the extra-dimensional band of characters who slide into alternate realities, known as Weapon X. For a time he was also the leader of their counterpart team, the Exiles, and remains with the team to this day. This version of Sabretooth originally had no adamantium in his skeleton (though it was later revealed that his skeleton had become laced with adamantium like Wolverine), but was still superhumanly strong and possessed a regenerative healing factor."

When Sabretooth decided to leave Weapon X, he stayed behind in a dimension to ensure that that reality's version of David Richards, the son of Franklin Richards and Rachel Summers, would not be corrupted by his virtually omnipotent powers. However, the boy turned evil anyway, despite Sabretooth's best efforts at raising him right.

When he was recruited by the Timebroker into the Exiles, Blink's personality became incredibly docile and subservient to Creed. Sabretooth gladly took the leadership role from Blink, a fact that Mimic clashed with him over multiple times. He continued to assist the Exiles in the race to catch Proteus. He survived being teleported into outer space by Blink (albeit by accident). After Proteus' defeat, Sabretooth stayed with the team to help fix the multiverse.

Later, when the Exiles needed to defeat the Silver Surfer, this version temporarily becomes a Herald of Galactus. He uses the powers he gained to maul the Silver Surfer, then after he no longer needed it he returned the Power Cosmic to Galactus.

At Sabretooth's request, Heather unhinges Psylocke from Earth-616 to join the Exiles in Power Princess' place as she might be their only chance if Proteus ever resurfaces. However, upon arrival, she clashes with Sabretooth, thinking him to be the Earth-616 Sabretooth that nearly killed her twice. They fight for a while, but eventually Psylocke catches on to the fact that Sabretooth is not there for a fight and Morph intervenes and makes an introduction. Surprisingly, Psylocke cannot be detected by any of Panoptichron's cameras. Heather teleports Morph, Sabretooth, and Psylocke down to Earth-1720 to save the other Exiles, who are beaten or brainwashed, courtesy of this world's Madame Hydra, Sue Storm. He and the other Exiles save their brainwashed friends after fighting them. Sabretooth then returns to an empty Panoptichron. He and Psylocke have been getting closer since their fight. It was later revealed on their first mission of the Exiles with Sabretooth as the new team leader, that his skeleton was now laced with adamantium, though exactly how this happened has yet to be revealed, as he never been previously shown to have had any such enhancements. Sabretooth was lost along with Mystique, Valeria, Sage, Rogue, and Gambit (most of the New Exiles team) when they were immersed within the Crystal Palace.

Apparently Blink and the new team of Exiles had found a way to reverse the process as Sabretooth has since been returned to the Age of Apocalypse, since he and Wild Child are seen following and confronting the X-Force from Earth-616. After teaming with X-Force to save Archangel, most of the AoA X-Men are killed. Nightcrawler stays on Earth-616 to join X-Force while Sabretooth returns to AoA with the only other survivor, Jean Grey. There, they face off against Weapon Omega, formerly this world's Logan and Jean Grey's husband. In an attempt to recreate the Decimation with clones of the Scarlet Witch, both Jean and Sabretooth end up powerless. They go on the run with the X-Terminated, and Sabretooth was injured a while later fighting Weapon Omega while saving Jean. In the months that followed, his son Graydon, also known as Horror Show, patched him up physically and the two made their peace. During the X-Termination crossover, AoA Nightcrawler's trip home resulted in the release of three evil beings that destroy anyone they touch. Several casualties resulted, including the AoA's Sabretooth, Horror Show, and Fiend, as well as the X-Treme X-Men's Xavier and Hercules.

Earth X
In another alternate reality, Earth X, Sabretooth was a member of a Hominid race of half-men, half-beast creatures known as the Bear Clan (along with the Wendigo spirit), who were staunch opponents of the Moon Clan, of which Wolverine was a member (along with Wild Child, Sasquatch, and Beast).

House of M
In the House of M alternate reality created by Scarlet Witch, Sabretooth is a messenger/assassin sent by Magneto. He was dispatched to assassinate Graydon Creed. Magneto sent Sabretooth to deliver a threat to Black Panther. After a short fight, Black Panther decapitates Sabretooth with a vibranium sword, then returns the head to Magneto. It is unknown as to whether or not the head was reunited with the body at a later stage, but this seems unlikely due to later events.

Marvel Noir
In the Wolverine Noir series, this version of Sabretooth is only known by his name, Victor Creed, who owns a hotel named "The Puritan" as well as a boxing club called "Victory Boxing" in the southeast of the Bowery, which was used to get kids off the street. Logan's partner, Dog, mentioned Creed in the Puritan after he disappeared. Logan, expected by Victor, goes to the boxing club and the two fight; Victor beats him and has his body thrown into the alley, where Yuriko's body was also lying. Victor and his thugs capture Logan after he passes out outside of a bar, taking him to the train yards where Rose and Mariko are waiting with Dog tied to the train tracks. Rose reveals that she had Victor bring Logan and Dog here so that she could get revenge on them. Dog is run over by a train during this conversation and Rose shoots Mariko in the head so she could not betray them to help Logan, which makes Logan kill her and her thugs. Victor runs off during the fight, wishing Rose "good luck in hell".

Marvel Zombies
During Marvel Zombies, Sabretooth, as a zombie, is one of a group of zombie villains who team together to try to devour the visiting Galactus. They manage to hurt the cosmic being, but are thrown off their goal by zombie "heroes", Wolverine being one of them. In the course of the battle, Wolverine decapitates Sabretooth.

Mutant X
In the Mutant X reality, a feral Sabretooth roams the Canadian Wilderness with feral versions of Wolverine and Wild Child who help make up "The Pack". Near the end of the series he breaks off from "the Pack" rejoining up with Weapon X to bring back Wolverine. After kidnapping Wolverine's family Wolverine confronts him and kills him by chopping his head off.

Old Man Logan

Ultimate Marvel

The Ultimate Marvel Universe depiction of Sabretooth is a mutant soldier and commando for Weapon X, under the direction of a man by the name of Colonel Wraith who referred to him as "a poor man's Wolverine". He appears to be the only mutant who enlisted in the program by choice, due to his high-ranking position and his high authority in the operations. He is practically the same as the Earth-616 version of Sabretooth, having accelerated healing and keen senses, with the exception that he has four adamantium claws surgically implanted in each arm in an attempt to one-up Wolverine after having many failures in the service of Weapon X. One of the adamantium claws implanted in his left forearm is broken. Exactly how and when this occurred has not been revealed. He has a burning hatred for Wolverine and also, as he stated in his encounter with him at Weapon X, for the primitive Homo sapiens. He feels that his cruel, psychopathic nature was merely a natural part of being a mutant. When Magneto attempted to destroy the world so that he could eradicate humans, Sabretooth asked him to kill as few animals as possible.

He cruelly boasts of murdering Wolverine's wife and child, and then commenced battle with him outside the Weapon X compound. He initially had the upper hand, but Wolverine managed to score a critical hit, a stab to Sabretooth's groin, before driving him off the edge of a cliff.

Following Sabretooth's loss to Wolverine, the Weapon X program was dismantled with Colonel Wraith being shot dead by Nick Fury. Sabretooth did not die from his encounter with Wolverine, but rather returned as a high-ranking follower to Magneto in the Brotherhood of Mutants. His encounter with Wolverine while with the Brotherhood was his final underestimation of his old enemy. After boasting that he can survive any wound or injury, and would always return to fight and haunt Wolverine, Wolverine gives a vicious retort: he decapitates Sabretooth on the spot, although the panel was partially covered, so that the full effect of the injury was not visible.

Sabretooth was long thought dead until he resurfaces one night when Wolverine and Storm were leaving Nowhere Special (a pool hall). He is alive and well sporting a new scar around his neck, apparently from the decapitation he received from Wolverine when they last met. Sabretooth explains that his head had remained partially attached to his body via strands of tissue and blood vessels, which allowed him to survive in a comatose state while his body regenerated. He also made one startling revelation: Wolverine is his biological father. Sabretooth then attempts to obtain a tissue sample so that Dr. Cornelius can clone a new Wolverine. During the beginning of the "Aftermath" arc, Sabretooth tells Wolverine that he is Wolverine's son. He also wants to help Wolverine search for his wife, Sabretooth's mother, although Wolverine claims that his scent proves that this is not true.

Sabretooth made a one-panel cameo in the "Magical" arc, standing outside the Xavier Institute while hiding behind a tree, with a look of sorrow on his face.

In Ultimates 3 and Ultimatum, Sabretooth is shown to use his claws as weapons (like the main Marvel Universe version of Sabretooth) instead of his four adamantium claws. No canon explanation has been given for this change. Sabretooth alongside Juggernaut were recruited by Rogue and Wraith to help fight Magneto. He kills Angel, before being shot in the eye by Hawkeye. In Ultimatum #5, he is shown pulling Mystique off of Magneto's citadel before the lower levels explode. They are later seen as part of Quicksilver's new Brotherhood in Wundagore.

Sabretooth later sported a feline appearance when he fought Electro over something that involved Norman Osborn. Their fight was broken up by Spider-Man with help from Cloak and Dagger.

X-Men Forever
In, X-Men Forever, Chris Claremont's continuation of his run on X-Men (non-canonical to the mainstream timeline and taking place in the 161 Marvel Universe), Sabretooth is established as Wolverine's father. He attacks the X-Mansion, but is blinded by Storm, as well as losing one hand and having his healing factor shut down. He subsequently joins the X-Men to honor his son, using his still-enhanced senses to compensate for his lack of vision, and a bionic replacement for his hand. It is also revealed that the Sabretooth that fought alongside the Marauders is a clone made by Sinister; the true Sabretooth, while initially villainous, is less psychotic and as such is able to truly reform. The two Sabretooths do battle on one occasion.

X-Factor Forever
Sabretooth appears in Louise Simonson and Dan Panosian's five issue run on X-Factor Forever.

Age of X
In the Age of X reality, it was revealed that Sabretooth has been captured by the Sapiens League and paraded down the streets as a dangerous mutant as shown in Tempo's memory. He was later used by the Avengers to track other mutants- his jaw removed and replaced with metal joints, his words suggesting that whatever caused this injury left him with brain damage - under the codename 'Weapon S', but the Hulk kills him after leading them to the fortress as his head is crushed.

Wolverine MAX
In the 2012 series Wolverine MAX, Logan is shown to be living in Japan as a monk when he first meets a blond, older man calling himself "Victor". Victor tells Logan that he is "just like him". When Logan refuses to accept Victor's claim as truth, Victor responds by saying "Okay then, I'll just have to prove it", before hurling the former into a nearby tree, proving his superhuman strength.

In other media

Television
 Sabretooth appears in X-Men: The Animated Series, voiced by Don Francks. This version, also known as Graydon Creed Sr., is a recurring enemy and reluctant ally of Wolverine and the X-Men who was born in Edmonton, Alberta.
 Sabretooth appears in X-Men: Evolution, voiced by Michael Donovan. This version is a member of Magneto's Acolytes. Following Magneto's death and the Acolytes' disbandment, Sabretooth leaves for parts unknown.
 Sabretooth appears in Wolverine and the X-Men, voiced by Peter Lurie. This version is a member of Weapon X who was previously partnered with Wolverine until the latter refused to harm an innocent and attacked him instead.
 Sabretooth appears in The Super Hero Squad Show, voiced by Charlie Adler. This version is a member of Doctor Doom's Lethal Legion.
 Sabretooth appears in the Ultimate Spider-Man episode "Freaky", voiced again by Peter Lurie.
 Sabretooth appears in Marvel Disk Wars: The Avengers, voiced by Takuya Kirimoto in the Japanese version and again by Peter Lurie in the English version.

Film

 Sabretooth appears in X-Men, portrayed by Tyler Mane. This version is a member of Magneto's Brotherhood of Mutants. While helping the Brotherhood in their plot to turn humans into mutants and fending off the X-Men at the Statue of Liberty, Sabretooth fights Wolverine until the former is blasted off by Cyclops.
 Sabretooth appears in Hulk vs. Wolverine, voiced by Mark Acheson. This version is a member of Team X.
 Victor Creed appears in X-Men Origins: Wolverine, portrayed by Liev Schreiber while Michael-James Olsen portrays a younger Creed. This version is Wolverine's half-brother. While fighting in the American Civil War, World War I, World War II, and the Vietnam War and serving in William Stryker's Team X together, Creed grows increasingly violent and uncontrollable, which contributes to Wolverine leaving Team X. Despite this, Creed stays with Stryker, helping him capture mutants to experiment on and manipulate Wolverine into bonding Adamantium to his skeleton until Stryker denies Creed the chance to undergo the operation himself. Despite their animosity, Creed and Wolverine join forces to defeat Weapon XI before re-parting ways.
 Sabretooth was originally meant to appear in Logan, but was removed from the final screenplay.

Video games
 Sabretooth appears as the final boss of Wolverine.
 Sabretooth appears as a playable character in X-Men vs. Street Fighter, voiced by Don Francks.
 Sabretooth appears as a playable character in Marvel vs. Capcom 2: New Age of Heroes, voiced again by Don Francks.
 Sabretooth appears as a playable character in X-Men: Mutant Academy, voiced again by Don Francks. This version is a member of the Brotherhood of Mutants.
 Sabretooth appears as a playable character in X-Men: Mutant Academy 2, voiced again by Don Francks. This version is a member of the Brotherhood of Mutants.
 Sabretooth appears as a playable character in X-Men: Next Dimension, voiced by Fred Tatasciore. This version is a member of the Brotherhood of Mutants.
 Sabretooth appears as a boss in X2: Wolverine's Revenge, voiced again by Fred Tatasciore.
 Sabretooth appears as a boss in X-Men Legends, voiced by Peter Lurie. This version is a member of the Brotherhood of Mutants.
 An amalgamated incarnation of Sabretooth appears as a playable character in the PC version of X-Men Legends II: Rise of Apocalypse, voiced again by Peter Lurie. This version is a member of the Brotherhood of Mutants who possesses the mainstream incarnation's personality and history coupled with the Ultimate Marvel incarnation's appearance. Additionally, similarly to the "Age of Apocalypse" and Exiles incarnations, he serves as a father figure to Blink.
 Sabretooth appears as a boss in X-Men: The Official Game, voiced by Tyler Mane.
 Sabretooth appears as a downloadable playable character in the Xbox 360 version of Marvel: Ultimate Alliance, voiced again by Peter Lurie. He was made available through the "Villain Pack" DLC. Additionally, his "Age of Apocalypse", Ultimate Marvel, and original comics designs appear as alternate skins.
 Sabretooth appears in the X-Men Origins: Wolverine tie-in game, voiced by Liev Schreiber.
 Sabretooth appears in Marvel Super Hero Squad, voiced again by Charlie Adler.
 Sabretooth appears in Marvel Super Hero Squad Online.
 Sabretooth appears in the Nintendo DS version of X-Men: Destiny.
 The Marvel Zombies incarnation of Sabretooth makes a cameo appearance in Frank West's ending in Ultimate Marvel vs Capcom 3.
 Sabretooth appears as a boss, later playable character, in Marvel: Avengers Alliance. This version is a member of the Brotherhood of Mutants.
 Sabretooth appears in LittleBigPlanet as part of the "Marvel Costume Kit 6" DLC.
 Sabretooth appears in Marvel Heroes, voiced by Neil Kaplan.
 Sabretooth appears as a playable character in Lego Marvel Super Heroes, voiced by Travis Willingham. This version is a member of the Brotherhood of Mutants.
 Sabretooth appears as a playable character in Marvel Contest of Champions.
 Sabretooth appears as a playable character in Marvel Puzzle Quest.
 Sabretooth appears as a playable character in Marvel Strike Force. This version is a member of the Brotherhood of Mutants.
 Sabretooth appears in Marvel's Midnight Suns, voiced again by Peter Lurie.

Books
 Sabretooth appears as a holodeck simulation in Planet X.
 Sabretooth appears in the novelization and comic book prequel tie-in for X2, in which it is revealed he survived being blasted by Cyclops, was the subject of an international manhunt, and had a brief confrontation with Logan to talk about their shared history.

Miscellaneous
 Sabretooth appeared in the 2010 comic strip The Amazing Spider-Man. This version is Wolverine's brother.
 Sabretooth appears in the Wolverine versus Sabretooth motion comic, voiced by Ron Halder.

Collected editions

Notes

References

External links
 Sabretooth at Marvel.com

Villains in animated television series
Avengers (comics) characters
Characters created by Chris Claremont
Characters created by John Byrne (comics)
Comics characters introduced in 1977
Fictional assassins in comics
Fictional Canadian people in comics
Fictional cannibals
Fictional characters with memory disorders
Fictional characters with slowed ageing
Fictional characters with superhuman durability or invulnerability
Fictional characters with superhuman senses
Fictional Korean War veterans
Fictional mass murderers
Fictional mercenaries in comics
Fictional rapists
Fictional secret agents and spies
Fictional serial killers
Fictional super soldiers
Fictional Vietnam War veterans
Fictional World War II veterans
Male film villains
Marvel Comics characters who can move at superhuman speeds
Marvel Comics characters with accelerated healing
Marvel Comics characters with superhuman strength
Marvel Comics film characters
Marvel Comics male superheroes
Marvel Comics male supervillains
Marvel Comics martial artists
Marvel Comics military personnel
Marvel Comics mutants
Wolverine (comics) characters
X-Factor (comics)
X-Men supporting characters